The Frederick County Sheriff's Office (FCSO) is the primary law enforcement agency serving a population of 222,938 residents within the  area of Frederick County, Maryland.

Accreditation
 Commission on Accreditation for Law Enforcement (CALEA)
 Commission on Accreditation (CAC) American Correctional Association
 National Commission on Correctional Health Care (NCCHC)

Overview
The Frederick County Sheriff's Office (FCSO) is organized into two different bureaus (Law Enforcement Bureau & Corrections Bureau), which consists of divisions, sections, and services.

Sheriff's of Frederick County, Maryland
Sheriff Charles A. (Chuck) Jenkins, 2006-Present
Sheriff James W. Hagey, 1994-2006
Sheriff Carl R. Harbaugh, 1990-1994
Sheriff Robert C. Snyder, 1982-1990
Sheriff Donald C. Barnes, 1974-1982
Sheriff Richard O. Baumgartner, 1970-1974
Sheriff Crummell P. Jacobs, 1966-1970
Sheriff Horace M. Alexander, 1953-1966
Sheriff R. Paul Buhrman, 1953
Sheriff Guy Anders, 1946-1952

Headquarters
The Frederick County Sheriff's Office (FCSO) shares its headquarters building with the local Maryland State Police (MSP) unit (Barrack B-Frederick) and the Frederick County Emergency Communications (FCEC) Center.

Law Enforcement Bureau

Operations Division
The Operations Division consists of three operational sections:

Patrol Operations-

Patrol Teams
Honor Guard
K-9 Program
Community Deputies
School Resource Officers (SRO)
Pro-Active Criminal Enforcement (PACE) Team
Traffic Unit
Civil Order and Firearms Surrender Programs

Special Operations-

Crime Analysis
Criminal Investigations Section
Evidence Unit
Pawn Unit
Narcotics Investigations Section
Crisis Negotiation Team
SWAT

The Special Operations unit comprises the Criminal Investigations, Gaming, Pawn, Special Assignment, Task Force, and Crime Analysis sections. A Juvenile Specialist, Evidence Custodian, and the Special Services Team are also part of Special Operations.

Judicial Services-

Civil Process Unit
Court Security Unit

A Civil Process unit, Child Support section, Court Security force, and Alarms/Permits unit are part of Judicial Operations.

Administrative Services Division
The Administrative Services Division consists of three administrative support sections to include :

Personnel Services-

Background & Recruiting
Police Information Specialist
Records Section

Personnel Services includes the Background/Recruiting, Polygraph, and Accreditation sections.

Fiscal Services-

Agency Property Management
Billing Coordination
Budget Development & Management 
Capital Improvement Projects
Grants
Planning & Research
Purchasing
Quartermaster

Fiscal Services comprises the Budget Development and Management, Planning & Research, Grants, Capital Improvement Projects, Purchasing, Quartermaster, Agency Property Management, and Billing Coordination sections.

Support Services-
Building Management
Community Services Section
Crime Prevention
Crossing Guards
Intern Program
Training   

Support Services includes the Police Information Specialist, Records Section, Fleet Management, Building Management, Victim Services, School Resource Section, Community Services Section, Crime Prevention, Youth Services, Crossing Guards, Reserve Deputies, and Volunteer sections.

Training Services includes the In-Service Training, Police Academy Training, Field Training, Intern Program, Citizens Police Academy, and Community Assistance Patrol Academy sections.

Corrections Bureau

Administrative Division
Accounting
Procurement & Budgeting
Personnel
Logistics
Inmate Records
Accreditation
Technology
Background Investigations
P.R.E.A
Compliance/Disciplinary Office

Security Division
Security Operations
Transportation Unit
Emergency Response Team
Central Booking
Gang Intelligence
287 (g) Program
IGSA Program

Community Services Division
Alternative Sentencing Program
Work Release Program
Home Detention Program
Pretrial Services Unit

Inmate Services Division
Classification & Programs
Food Services
Medical & Mental Health Services

Incidents

2013-In December 2013, Deputy First Class Todd Joia was charged with entry without breaking in nearby Berkeley County, West Virginia. The case is related to the theft of more than two thousand dollars from a pair of gambling machines. The deputy was suspended when his arrest was made known to his department. In February 2014, he resigned from the office, was sentenced to a year on probation and restitution. During the same week, Deputy First Class Kevin Darnell White was suspended when he was arrested for an off-duty drunken assault in nearby Hagerstown, Maryland. He was also suspended and later acquitted of all charges.

2013-On 12 January 2013, three Frederick County Sheriff's Office (FCSO) Deputies were out of uniform while working after hours as security guards. They were called to a movie theater where a man with Down syndrome refused to leave the cinema after the movie was over. The three, Lieutenant Scott Jewell, Sergeant Rich Rochford, and Deputy First Class James Harris, confronted Ethan Saylor and his caregiver. In the confrontation the three men fell on the 26-year-old Saylor and handcuffed him. He then died of asphyxiation. A grand jury did not return any charges in the case. As of July 25, 2013 the federal Department of Justice was investigating Saylor's death as a civil rights case.

2013-At one o'clock in the morning on 10 January 2013, deputies dressed in military gear tried to conduct a no-knock arrest warrant on nineteen-year-old Daniel Vail. Vail was wanted in a nearby county for a home invasion. The deputies threw a stun grenade into Vail's bedroom to disorient him. Unnamed deputies said the naked man had a shotgun in his hands. After the deputies ordered him to drop the weapon, they fired eighteen bullets, killing Vail. An internal investigation by the Frederick County Sheriff's Office cleared the deputies of any wrongdoing.

2011-Deputy Sam Bowman was indicted in 2011 on several charges of having sexually abused a 14-year-old girl. He was assigned as a school resource officer at Walkersville High School.

2006-Sergeant Theodore Randolph "Randy" Dorsey was indicted on arson charges in November, 2006 related to destroying his vehicle as part of an insurance scam.

See also

 List of law enforcement agencies in Maryland

References

External links
 https://www.frederickcosheriff.com
 Sheriff Jenkins biography
 List of Sheriffs in Frederick County since 1748
 https://msa.maryland.gov/msa/mdmanual/36loc/fr/jud/sheriffs/former/html/00list.html
 Frederick County Sheriffs Office, Maryland
 https://mdsp.maryland.gov/Organization/Pages/FieldOperationsBureau/allbarracks.aspx

Sheriff's Office
Sheriffs' offices of Maryland